The History of Nebraska Cornhuskers football covers the history of the University of Nebraska–Lincoln's football program, from its inception in 1890 until the present day. Nebraska competes as part of the NCAA Division I Football Bowl Subdivision, in the West Division of the Big Ten. Nebraska plays its home games at Memorial Stadium, where it has sold out every game since 1962.

Nebraska is among the most storied programs in college football history and has the eighth-most all-time victories among FBS teams. Nebraska claims forty-six conference championships and five national championships (1970, 1971, 1994, 1995, and 1997), and has won six other national championships the school does not claim. NU's 1971 and 1995 title-winning teams are considered among the best in college football history. Famous Cornhuskers include Heisman Trophy winners Johnny Rodgers, Mike Rozier, and Eric Crouch, who join twenty-two other Cornhuskers in the College Football Hall of Fame. Notable among these are players Bob Brown, Guy Chamberlin, Tommie Frazier, Rich Glover, Dave Rimington, and Will Shields, and coaches Bob Devaney and Tom Osborne.

The program's first extended period of success came just after the turn of the century. Between 1900 and 1916, Nebraska had five undefeated seasons and completed a stretch of thirty-four consecutive games without a loss, still a program record. Despite a span of twenty-one conference championships in thirty-three seasons, the Cornhuskers didn't experience major national success until Bob Devaney was hired in 1962. In eleven seasons as head coach, Devaney won two national championships, eight conference titles, and coached twenty-two All-Americans, but perhaps his most lasting achievement was the hiring of Tom Osborne as offensive coordinator in 1969. Osborne was named Devaney's successor in 1973, and over the next twenty-five years established himself as one of the best coaches in college football history with his trademark I-form offense and revolutionary strength, conditioning, and nutrition programs. Following Osborne's retirement in 1997, Nebraska has cycled through five head coaches, with Mickey Joseph serving as interim head coach following the firing of Scott Frost.  On November 26, 2022 Nebraska announced the hiring of Matt Rhule to step in as the next head coach of Husker football.

The early years

Program beginnings (1890–99)
Nebraska's football history began in 1890 as the "Old Gold Knights", which was changed to "Bugeaters" just two years later. "Cornhuskers" first appeared in an 1893 school newspaper headline ("We Have Met The Cornhuskers And They Are Ours") after an upset victory over Iowa. In this instance, "Cornhuskers" was used to derogatorily refer to Iowa. Nebraska State Journal writer Cy Sherman, who would later help create college football's AP Poll, was the first to use the term in reference to Nebraska; the nickname caught on quickly and was officially adopted in 1900.

Dr. Langdon Frothingham, a newly hired veterinary pathologist from Harvard, coached the school's first season; the main reason for this was that he had brought a football with him from the East Coast. Nebraska's first game was a 10–0 Thanksgiving Day victory over the Omaha YMCA on November 27, 1890. Frothingham broke his leg during a practice prior to the season's only other game, an 18–0 win over Doane that actually took place in February 1891. He returned to Massachusetts after the season, leaving Nebraska without a coach. Prior to NU's 1891 matchup with Iowa, however, the Hawkeyes sent Iowa College coach Theron Lyman to Lincoln to help Nebraska prepare for the more experienced Hawkeyes. Nebraska credits Lyman as its coach for the game, though he likely did not even attend Iowa's 22–0 win. In the middle of the 1892 season, Omaha attorney J.S. Williams began coaching the team. Williams' first and only game was a 1–0 forfeit victory over Missouri, after the Tigers refused to play due to the presence of African-American George Flippin on Nebraska's roster. Flippin was NU's first African-American athlete, and only the fifth black athlete at any predominantly white university. The forfeiture resulted in, technically, Nebraska's first-ever win against a conference opponent.

Frank Crawford (1893–94, 9–4–1) became the school's first official football coach when he was hired in 1893. He has the unique distinction of being the first full-time head coach at both Nebraska and Michigan. Under Crawford's leadership, NU won its first conference championship in 1894. He was a vocal critic of Flippin, his star player and an African-American. When Flippin was voted team captain by his teammates in 1893, Crawford vetoed the election, stating, "It takes a man with brains to be a captain; all there is to Flippin is brute force." When Crawford left for Texas, assistant coach Charles Thomas (1895, 6–3) was named his replacement. Nebraska went 6–3 in his only season, winning the WIUFA for the second straight year.

Nebraska was led by a pair of future College Football Hall of Fame head coaches over the next three seasons. While they both are better known for their tenures at other universities, Eddie N. Robinson (1896–97, 11–4–1) and Fielding H. Yost (1898, 8–3) led Nebraska to a combined 19–7–1 record from 1896 to 1898. Alonzo Edwin Branch (1899, 1–7–1) took over the program for the 1899 season, Nebraska's only losing season in its first twenty-nine years of competition.

A Midwest power (1900–17)

Walter C. Booth (1900–05, 46–8–1) quickly turned Nebraska into a Midwest football power. At one point during his tenure, Booth's teams won twenty-four straight games, setting a program record that stood until 1995. His 1902 team outscored its opponents 186–0 en route to a 10–0 season. After another dominating season in 1903, it was written that Booth could "weep with Alexander the Great", given Nebraska's difficulty finding competitive and willing opposition in the Midwest. Booth retired in 1906, and a year later Nebraska hired W.C. Cole (1907–10, 25–8–3), a former player and assistant coach for Fielding Yost at Michigan.

After nine seasons as an independent, Nebraska joined the MVIAA in 1907. NU's 16–6 win over Kansas in their lone conference game was enough to claim the MVIAA title in Cole's first season. During Cole's four-year tenure, Nebraska played its first season at Nebraska Field, the school's first venue designed to host football games. When the MVIAA passed legislation in 1910 requiring football coaches to be full-time faculty members, Cole resigned, feeling he could not manage his farm in Missoula while living year-round in Lincoln. In his final game as head coach, Nebraska beat Haskell 119–0 at Nebraska Field, still the largest margin of victory in program history.

Nebraska hired Ewald O. "Jumbo" Stiehm (1911–15, 35–2–3) to replace Cole. The fiery Stiehm was subject to such frequent outbursts that the school established a women's sitting section at Nebraska Field far from the home sideline. Despite his temperament, his "Stiehm Roller" teams were highly successful, winning the conference title each season and losing only two games during his five-year tenure. Under Stiehm's watch, Nebraska began a school-record thirty-four game unbeaten stretch and Guy Chamberlin was named the first All-American in program history. Led by Chamberlin, Nebraska finished the 1915 season undefeated, but the university declined an opportunity to play in the first Rose Bowl. Stiehm, who also coached Nebraska's basketball team to three conference championships, was offered $4,500 annually to take over Indiana's athletic department. Despite suggesting he'd remain at Nebraska for less money, the school refused to offer him a raise and Stiehm exited with the highest winning percentage of any coach in school history.

E. J. Stewart (1916–17, 25–8–3) replaced Stiehm in 1916, but coached only two seasons before leaving to assist in the war effort (he later returned to coach Nebraska's basketball team). NU won its seventh- and eighth-consecutive MVIAA titles in Stewart's two years, though the school's thirty-four game unbeaten stretch came to an end in 1916. Stewart was instrumental in reestablishing Nebraska's baseball program, which had been dormant since 1912, and urged the university to schedule strong opponents across all sports to "add to Nebraska prestige throughout the United States".

With its roster and coaching staff depleted by World War I and the Spanish flu pandemic, Nebraska turned to professor William G. Kline (1918, 2–3–1) to coach the shortened 1918 season. After the war, Nebraska played for two years independent of the MVIAA, during which Henry Schulte (1919–20, 2–3–1) took over coaching duties. Schulte was head coach for only two seasons, but stayed on staff until 1927, and led NU's track and field program until 1938. Nebraska named the Schulte Fieldhouse in his honor, which stood from its completion in 1946 until the Osborne Athletic Complex took its place in 2006.

The first stretch of coaching stability in program history began with the hire of Fred Dawson (1921–24, 23–7–2) in 1921. Dawson's four-year tenure was most notable for NU's series of games against Notre Dame and legendary coach Knute Rockne. Nebraska's only loss during a dominant 1921 season was against the Irish, but the Cornhuskers returned the favor in 1922 and 1923, becoming the only team to defeat Notre Dame's famed Four Horsemen. The 1922 matchup was the final game played at Nebraska Field; with an estimated 16,000 fans it was also the highest-attended. Dawson coached Ed Weir, the program's first two-time All-American, and Link Lyman, the first Nebraska alumni elected to the Pro Football Hall of Fame. He won three conference titles, although his final season marked the end of Nebraska's streak of eleven straight MVIAA titles (interrupted by 1918, when no official conference games were played, and the following two years, when NU played as an independent).

New stadium and sustained success (1923–41)

College football exploded in popularity in the years after World War I, and in 1922, Nebraska began raising funds to construct a larger stadium at the old Nebraska Field site. Construction on the $430,000 stadium, with an original capacity of 31,080, lasted just four months. On October 13, 1923, Nebraska defeated Oklahoma in the first game at Memorial Stadium, named to honor the Nebraskans who died in World War I (since expanded to include Nebraskans who died in World War II, the Korean War, and the Vietnam War).

Dawson retired to become athletic director in 1925 and Robert Zuppke assistant Ernest E. Bearg (1925–28, 23–7–3) was named his replacement. Bearg won the first Big Six championship in 1928, but was frequently criticized by fans for "not using strategy and deception", and he resigned after the season. Nebraska tried to hire Rockne away from Notre Dame, but ultimately settled on another future Hall of Fame head coach, Dana X. Bible (1929–36, 50–15–7). Bible followed eleven highly successful years at Texas A&M with six Big Six titles in eight years at Nebraska. His 1936 team was ranked No. 15 in the first AP Poll, and finished the year ninth. Bible coached four All-Americans at Nebraska and nearly won the program's first national title (though it would have been a retroactive selection) in 1933. Bible accepted a lucrative offer to coach Texas after the 1936 season, but assisted Nebraska in the search for his replacement, Biff Jones (1937–41, 28–14–4). Running back Sam Francis became Nebraska's first No. 1 overall selection in the NFL Draft in 1937.

Jones served in World War I and coached at Army for four years, before stints at LSU and Oklahoma. He took NU to the program's first bowl game, a 21–13 loss to Stanford in the 1941 Rose Bowl. The following year, Nebraska lost five consecutive games for the first time ever, and Jones was recalled to serve in World War II just days after the last game of the season. Though Nebraska maintained Jones' position would still be available to him after the war, he remained at West Point for years after and never coached college football again. He was inducted into the College Football Hall of Fame in 1954.

Nebraska's 25–9 victory over Kansas State in 1939 was broadcast locally in certain parts of the Manhattan area, making it the second televised college football game.

Slide into obscurity (1942–61)

The landscape of college football changed drastically during World War II, as most able-bodied men were drawn into the war effort in some way. While Nebraska was still able to field a team, something many other major programs could not do, the Cornhuskers had four straight losing seasons after only three in the program's first fifty-one years. The situation become so dire that athletic director George Clark (1945, 1948, 6–13–0), a veteran of both wars with an extensive coaching pedigree, had to step in to coach the 1948 season after retiring in 1945. During these years, center Tom Novak became Nebraska's first four-time all-conference selection, and later was the first player in program history to have his number retired.

In 1950, Nebraska and new head coach Bill Glassford (1949–55, 50–40–4) played the school's first "spring game", a 13–13 draw between the varsity team and an alumni team. Led by twenty-two touchdowns from All-American Bobby Reynolds, NU had its first winning season since 1940 and finished the season ranked seventeenth. Glassford led the Cornhuskers during their first night game, a 19–7 loss to Miami in 1951, and college football's first "NCAA-regulated" telecast, a 20–12 loss to Oregon in 1953. The hard-nosed coach, who at one point had to overrule a player petition calling for his firing, took Nebraska to its second bowl game, a 34–7 loss to Duke in the 1955 Orange Bowl. Glassford resigned in 1955, but survived until 2014, when he died at 102 as the oldest-living professional football player.

After a 4–6–1 1956 season under Pete Elliott, Nebraska hired twenty-nine year-old Bill Jennings (1957–61, 15–34–1) to lead the program. Jennings had no winning seasons in five years as head coach, but was responsible for Nebraska's upset victory over Oklahoma in 1959, which ended OU's seventy-four game conference winning streak. He frequently found himself at odds with program supporters, at one point stating, "There is an intense desire to do something good in this state, like elect a president or gain prominence in politics. But we can't feed the ego of the state of Nebraska with the football team." Jennings' last season in 1961 would be Nebraska's last losing season until 2004.

Devaney and Osborne dynasty

Bob Devaney era (1962–72)

New athletic director Tippy Dye did not renew Jennings' contract in 1962, and attempted to hire Michigan State head coach Duffy Daugherty. Daugherty instead suggested former assistant Bob Devaney, and after a lengthy contract dispute with Wyoming, Nebraska hired Devaney (1962–72, 101–20–2).

Nebraska beat Miami for its first bowl win in 1962, the first of forty consecutive winning seasons for the Cornhuskers. NU's November 3 loss to Missouri marked the beginning of Memorial Stadium's lengthy sellout streak. In his second season, Devaney ended Nebraska's thirty-two year conference title drought and won the school's first Orange Bowl. Despite similar success over the following years, including a loss in the 1966 Orange Bowl that would have won Nebraska the national championship, a pair of 6–4 seasons in 1967 and 1968 caused some to call for change within the program. Devaney responded by promoting thirty-one year-old assistant Tom Osborne to offensive coordinator. Osborne's later teams would become famous for their prolific use of the run-heavy I-form option, but his first offenses relied on a balanced attack out of the I formation; Dave Humm's 2,259 passing yards in 1972 were a program record until 2004.

Nebraska started the 1969 season 2–2, but did not suffer another loss until 1972. The program won its first national title in 1970, when bowl losses by Texas and Ohio State vaulted the Huskers to the top of the AP Poll. NU again won the national title in 1971, becoming the first and only champion to beat the teams that finished No. 2, No. 3, and No. 4 in the AP Poll. This included a 35–31 Thanksgiving Day defeat of No. 2 Oklahoma that caused Dan Jenkins of Sports Illustrated to suggest "it was the greatest collegiate football battle ever". It was Nebraska's only game decided by fewer than twenty-four points, including a 38–6 win over Alabama the Orange Bowl.

Devaney planned to retire following the season, but was convinced to return for 1972 in the hopes of winning an unprecedented third consecutive national title. Wingback Johnny Rodgers won the school's first Heisman Trophy and Nebraska beat Notre Dame to win the Orange Bowl for the third straight year, but a pair of losses effectively ended NU's title hope. Devaney retired after the season and became Nebraska's athletic director, a position he would fill until 1993, and Osborne became head coach.

Devaney ended his coaching career with eight Big Eight championships and an 136–30–7 overall record, good for the 11th-highest winning percentage in major college football history. His program produced eighteen All-Americans in his eleven years, including Rodgers, 1971 Outland Trophy winner Larry Jacobson, and 1972 Outland and Lombardi Award winner Rich Glover. The Bob Devaney Sports Center, completed in 1976, was named in his honor, and he was inducted into the College Football Hall of Fame in 1982. The school added a statue of Devaney outside the remodeled East Stadium at Memorial Stadium in 2013. Devaney died of a heart attack in 1997 at age eighty-two.

Tom Osborne era (1973–97)

Tom Osborne (1973–97, 255–49–3) took over for Devaney in 1973. Over the next twenty-five years, Osborne never lost more than three games in a season, secured thirteen conference titles, and only coached three games where the Cornhuskers were not in the AP Poll Top 25.

The first decade of Osborne's tenure was consistent, if not spectacular. NU lost either two or three games and finished ranked between seventh and twelfth every year from 1973 to 1981. After a disappointing 1976 season in which Nebraska started No. 1 but finished the regular season just 8–3–1, it was rumored Osborne may lose his job if he lost the Astro-Bluebonnet Bowl. However, these rumors were never confirmed, and Nebraska defeated Texas Tech 27–24. Two years later, Osborne beat rival Oklahoma for the first time, but Nebraska lost a rematch to the Sooners in the 1979 Orange Bowl after an upset loss to Missouri cost NU a chance at the national title. Following the season, Osborne interviewed for Colorado's head coaching position, but ultimately declined the offer.

1982 was Osborne's tenth season as head coach, and the first in which Nebraska lost just a single game. The Cornhuskers' only loss of the season came at Penn State in week three. On Penn State's game-winning drive, wide receiver Mike McCloskey was ruled in-bounds to convert a fourth down, despite replay clearly showing he was out-of-bounds; with no replay review to overturn the call, Penn State won the game and went on to claim the national title. Nebraska started the following season ranked No. 1, and won a rematch with Penn State 44–6 in the first Kickoff Classic. The Cornhuskers finished the regular season undefeated and set a Division I record for points in a season. The offense – led by option quarterback Turner Gill, Heisman Trophy winner Mike Rozier, and future No. 1 NFL Draft pick Irving Fryar – was termed "The Scoring Explosion". In the Orange Bowl, Nebraska immediately fell behind Miami, trailing 17–0 at the end of the first quarter. Early in the second quarter, Osborne called for the fumblerooski, a trick play which had Gill "fumble" the snap by intentionally setting the ball on the ground, where it was picked up by All-American guard Dean Steinkuhler, who ran nineteen yards for a touchdown. Nebraska mounted a furious comeback, scoring a touchdown to get within one point with just seconds remaining. However, Osborne elected to go for two and the win outright, despite a tie likely winning the national title for Nebraska, and the conversion pass fell incomplete.

Nebraska ended the 1980s with more wins than any other program, but failed to win a national championship from a major selector (though NU has five unclaimed titles from the decade). Barry Switzer's departure from Oklahoma in 1988 left the program mired in sanctions  and gave Nebraska a clearer path to conference success, but did not help the Cornhuskers on the national stage; from 1987 to 1993, NU lost seven straight bowl games to ACC opponents. The last of these was the controversial 1993 national championship game, in which a blown call at the goal line and a missed field goal cost Nebraska the title. Osborne was so upset by this loss that he had the scoreboard at Memorial Stadium display the 18–16 final score for the entire offseason.

Nebraska's 1993 team was led by star quarterback Tommie Frazier. Frazier was the biggest recruit in Osborne's 1992 class, which has since been listed among the greatest recruiting classes in college football history. Frazier, a Florida native, also represented a philosophical shift in recruiting for Osborne, who had historically been successful largely with Midwestern players and an unusually high number of walk-ons. In the middle of the 1994 season, however, a leg injury to Frazier meant pro-style backup Brook Berringer had to step in and run Osborne's option-based offense; Berringer's kind demeanor and heroics over the rest of the regular season endeared him to fans. While Frazier returned to start the national championship game, Berringer replaced him in the second quarter, and behind two Cory Schlesinger touchdowns, NU won Osborne his first outright national title as a head coach.

Nebraska's 1995 team is often listed as the greatest in college football history. Behind Frazier, who finished second in Heisman Trophy voting, and I-back Lawrence Phillips, the Cornhuskers won every game by at least fourteen points and set a college football record by scoring 53.2 points per game. Nebraska beat four teams that finished in the top ten, including a 62–24 Fiesta Bowl blowout victory over Florida and head coach Steve Spurrier to win the national championship. Osborne's title teams in 1994 and 1995 join Devaney's 1970 and 1971 teams as the only undefeated back-to-back national champions since 1956. Berringer was killed in a plane crash two days before the 1996 NFL Draft, where he was projected to be a mid-round selection. Over four thousand people attended his funeral service, and in 2006 a statue of Osborne and Berringer was erected at Memorial Stadium.

In 1996, the Big Eight merged with the Southwest to create the Big 12 Conference. Despite its similarity in name, the Big 12 was an entirely new conference and did not retain any of the Big Eight's history or records. After a shutout loss at Arizona State in week two, Nebraska won ten straight games to make the first Big 12 Championship Game. However, the Cornhuskers missed out on a fourth straight national championship appearance when they were upset by Texas.

Nebraska started the 1997 season outside the top five, but a win at second-ranked Washington quickly vaulted the Cornhuskers up to No. 1. A 45–38 overtime victory at Missouri in week nine kept the Huskers' title hopes alive, though it dropped NU to No. 3 in both polls. The comeback win was highlighted by the Flea Kicker, a last-second, game-tying touchdown that bounced off the foot of intended receiver Shevin Wiggins and directly into the hands of Matt Davison. Nebraska returned to the conference championship game and beat Texas A&M 54–15 for its first Big 12 title. Nebraska entered bowl season trailing Michigan in both polls, but a 42–17 victory over Peyton Manning and Tennessee in the Orange Bowl narrowly boosted NU to the top of the Coaches Poll.

On December 10, 1997, Osborne announced he would retire following the Orange Bowl, and longtime assistant Frank Solich would take over. NU's subsequent victory made him the only coach to retire following a national championship. Nebraska posted a 60–3 record in the final five years of Osborne's tenure. His career record of 255–49–3 gives him the fourth-highest winning percentage in major college football history.

Osborne was inducted into the College Football Hall of Fame in 1999, and has been recognized as one of the greatest coaches in college football history. After his retirement from coaching, Osborne was elected to Congress and represented Nebraska's third district from 2001 to 2007. He returned to the University of Nebraska as athletic director in 2007, retiring in 2013. The university finished construction on the Tom and Nancy Osborne Athletic Complex in 2006 and dedicated the field at Memorial Stadium in his honor.

The post-Osborne era

Program in transition (1998–2010)

Upon Osborne's retirement, the program was handed over to running backs coach Frank Solich (1998–2003, 58–18), who had played at Nebraska under Devaney. In his six seasons, Solich won the 1999 Big 12 title and took the Cornhuskers to the 2001 national championship game, a season in which quarterback Eric Crouch won the Heisman Trophy.

The Cornuskers slipped to 7–7 in 2002, the first non-winning season for Nebraska in forty years. That season also saw the Huskers fall out of the AP Poll altogether after being ranked every week since October 11, 1981. The run of 348 consecutive weeks in the AP Poll is still the longest in college football history. Following the season, Solich made aggressive changes to his coaching staff. The approach appeared successful, as the Cornhuskers improved to 9–3 in 2003, but second-year athletic director Steve Pederson fired Solich after the season, justifying the move with the now-infamous claim that he would not "let Nebraska gravitate into mediocrity" or "surrender the Big 12 to Oklahoma and Texas". First-year defensive coordinator Bo Pelini was appointed interim head coach and led the Cornhuskers to a 17–3 win over Michigan State in the Alamo Bowl. Solich was so upset with his alma mater and longtime employer that he did not return to Lincoln for over fifteen years.

Although Pelini interviewed for the position as permanent replacement, former Oakland Raiders coach Bill Callahan (2004–07, 27–22) was named Solich's successor following a forty-day, one-man coaching search conducted by Pederson. Callahan's mandate to prevent Nebraska's decline was not immediately successful, as his NFL-style West Coast offense was criticized harshly by fans for its departure from Osborne's run-dominant option. Criticism did not die down when Nebraska went 5–6 in Callahan's first year, NU's first losing season since 1961. Following moderate success in 2005 and 2006, 2007 saw the Huskers lose five consecutive games for the first time since 1958, including a record-setting 76–39 loss to Kansas. Pederson was fired as athletic director in the middle of the five-game slide. Osborne, who had retired from Congress earlier in the year to make an unsuccessful bid for governor, was named interim athletic director. Callahan later met the same fate as Pederson, as he was fired by Osborne immediately after a season-ending 65–51 loss to Colorado.

Osborne was named full-time athletic director in December and hired Pelini (2008–14, 67–27) to return to Nebraska as the program's thirty-second head coach. Pelini's first team tied for the Big 12 North division title with a 9–4 record, the best record among first-year FBS coaches. In 2009, Heisman finalist Ndamukong Suh helped Nebraska lead the country in scoring defense at 10.4 points per game, just two years after ranking among the nation's worst. NU finished 10–4 and Pelini was given a raise and contract extension. Following the 2010–11 academic year, the University of Nebraska announced it was ending its association with the Big 12 and joining the Big Ten Conference.

Move to the Big Ten (2011–present)

Pelini's four seasons coaching in the new conference resulted in only one conference title game appearance, a 70–31 loss to unranked Wisconsin in 2012. In 2014, following another season in which Nebraska performed poorly against high-quality opposition, athletic director Shawn Eichorst fired Pelini. At the time of the firing, the university still owed Pelini $7.65 million. Pelini left the program with a 67–27 record, winning either nine or ten games each season; NU lost three games under Pelini in his final season, the only year he did not lose exactly four games. School officials cited Pelini's lackluster record in important games and a pattern of "unprofessional behavior" toward fans, players, and school employees as contributing factors to his dismissal.

Shortly after, Eichorst hired Mike Riley to lead the program, a move that was harshly criticized given Riley's lack of recent success at Oregon State. The Cornhuskers ended 2014 under interim coach Barney Cotton, losing to USC in the Holiday Bowl and finishing 9–4, Nebraska's seventh consecutive four-loss season.

In 2016, Riley (2015–17, 19–19) took Nebraska into the national top five for the first time since 2010, but a 4–8 2017 season was the program's worst in fifty-six years. Following a home loss to Northern Illinois, University of Nebraska chancellor Ronnie D. Green fired Eichorst and appointed former Husker Dave Rimington interim athletic director. Bill Moos was hired as Eichorst's replacement in October and terminated Riley the day after the season ended. On December 2, 2017, Moos hired alumnus Scott Frost from UCF, after Frost led the Knights to a 13–0 2017 season. Frost began his Nebraska head coaching career just 9–15 through two seasons.

In 2019, Nebraska announced construction of a 350,000-square foot, $155 million athletic complex adjacent to Memorial Stadium's northeast corner. The following March, in the midst of a nationwide push to allow further student-athlete compensation, NU partnered with Opendorse to "help student-athletes build their individual brands", the first university to do so. Nebraska finished 3–5 in 2020, a season shortened by the COVID-19 pandemic, and the following year finished just 3–9. Frost was fired following a 1–2 start to the 2022 season, his fifth as Nebraska's head coach. At the time of Frost's departure, Nebraska's previous thirteen losses had come by nine points or fewer. Wide receivers coach Mickey Joseph was named Frost's interim replacement, making Joseph NU's first black head coach in any sport. Following the 2022 season, Nebraska announced the hiring of Matt Rhule to be the next head coach, after having served stints at Temple, Baylor and with the NFL's Carolina Panthers.

References

Nebraska Cornhuskers

American football teams established in 1890